Holborn Bars, also known as the Prudential Assurance Building is a large red terracotta Victorian building on the north side (138–142) of Holborn in Camden at the boundary of the City of London, England. The block is bounded by Holborn to the south, Brooke Street to the west, Leather Lane to the east and Beauchamp Street to the north. It is currently occupied by De Vere Venues and also the London office of English Heritage at 1 Waterhouse Square.

History 
Located close to the Holborn Bar city boundary of the City of London Holborn Bars was built on the site of the former Furnival's Inn building of the Inns of Chancery. It was designed in Gothic Revival style for the Prudential Assurance Society by architects initially  Alfred Waterhouse and his son Paul Waterhouse who became a partner in his father's firm from 1891, and built by Holland, Hannen & Cubitts in phases between 1876 and 1901. The interior design of the main entrance hall was completed in 1906.

The building was modified between 1930 and 1932 by E. M. Joseph, who introduced Art Deco features, and expanded again in 1993 by EPR Architects to a floor area of 34,931 square metres. Prudential moved out of the building in 1999 but retained ownership of it.

Description
The building originally featured a library, restaurant, chapel, hall, rooftop promenade and a women's entrance. It was electrically lit and featured hot running water. The complex now encloses a courtyard, Waterhouse Square, named after the original architect. The building was listed Grade II* on 3 March 1972.

Tenants 

Tenants include:
 Public Relations firm Weber Shandwick
 Law firm Gowling WLG
 WeWork
 ITV
 Prudential subsidiary M&G

References

External links 

 Images and tenants

Alfred Waterhouse buildings
Buildings and structures completed in 1901
Gothic Revival architecture in London
Grade II* listed buildings in the London Borough of Camden
Mass media company headquarters in the United Kingdom
Office buildings in London